Pavel hrabě Huyn (17 February 1868 in Brno – 1 October 1946 in Bolzano) was a Moravian-German Roman Catholic clergyman. He was bishop of Brno from 1904 to 1916 and archbishop of Prague from 1916 to 1919.

References

External links

Roman Catholic archbishops of Prague
1868 births
1946 deaths
Clergy from Brno
Moravian-German people